The 2018 Japanese Grand Prix (formally known as the Formula 1 2018 Honda Japanese Grand Prix) was a Formula One racing event held on 7 October 2018 at the Suzuka International Racing Course in Suzuka in the Mie Prefecture, Japan. The race was the seventeenth round of the 2018 Formula One World Championship and marked the 44th running of the Japanese Grand Prix.

Mercedes driver Lewis Hamilton entered the round with a fifty-point lead over Ferrari's Sebastian Vettel in the World Drivers' Championship. Hamilton's team-mate Valtteri Bottas sat third, a further 67 points behind. In the World Constructors' Championship, Mercedes held a lead of fifty-three points over Ferrari, with Red Bull Racing a further one hundred and fifty points behind in third place.

Report

Background
Ferrari introduced a new livery, carrying the logo of Mission Winnow, a joint promotion with major sponsor Philip Morris International.

Qualifying

Notes
  – Esteban Ocon received a three-place grid penalty for failing to slow sufficiently during a red flag period in FP3.
  – Marcus Ericsson received a 15-place grid penalty: 10 places for change his power unit and 5 places for an unscheduled gearbox change.

Race
Lewis Hamilton won whilst leading every lap. Sebastian Vettel, Hamilton's championship rival, clashed with Max Verstappen, Vettel would recover to finish 6th after spinning to the back of the field. Valtteri Bottas finished second behind Lewis Hamilton, with Verstappen finishing third.

Race classification

Championship standings after the race 

Drivers' Championship standings

Constructors' Championship standings

 Note: Only the top five positions are included for both sets of standings.
 Bold text and an asterisk indicates competitors who still had a theoretical chance of becoming World Champion.

References

2018 Formula One races
2018 in Japanese motorsport
2018
October 2018 sports events in Japan